Finalizer - Super Transformation is a vertically scrolling shooter released in arcades by Konami in 1985. The player controls a jet flying through several different states in America shooting different enemies.

Reception
In Japan, Game Machine listed Finalizer in their January 15, 1986 issue as being the fourth most-successful table arcade unit of the month.

References

External links
 
 Finalizer at Arcade History

1985 video games
Arcade video games
Arcade-only video games
Konami games
Vertically scrolling shooters
Konami arcade games
Video games developed in Japan